Theodore J. Kooser (born 25 April 1939) is an American poet. He won the Pulitzer Prize in Poetry in 2005. He served as Poet Laureate Consultant in Poetry to the Library of Congress from 2004 to 2006. Kooser was one of the first poets laureate selected from the Great Plains, and is known for his conversational style of poetry.

Biography

Early life
Ted Kooser was born in Ames, Iowa, on April 25, 1939. Growing up, Kooser attended Ames Public Schools for elementary and middle school. When Kooser arrived at Ames High School, his interest diverted from the library and went to cars. He joined the Nightcrawlers Car Club and became secretary of the group in 1956. His motivation for writing in high school can be in part credited to one of his teachers, Mary McNally, who encouraged him to continue writing essays and poems that reflected his life.

Education 
Kooser graduated from Ames High School with a class of 175 students and enrolled at Iowa State University, the alma mater of his uncles. He began writing short nonfiction stories for the Iowa State student literary magazine. He also joined the Iowa State Writer’s Round Table, which he credits for fine-tuning his writing skills; Iowa Senator Tom Harkin was also a part of the group. In 1961, Kooser moved to Marshalltown, Iowa, to student teach English classes. The following year he graduated with a BS in English education from Iowa State University and moved to Cedar Rapids, Iowa, to live with his parents. He was offered a graduate readership opportunity at the University of Nebraska-Lincoln and in 1963, he and his wife moved to Lincoln, Nebraska. After winning the Vreeland Award for poetry in 1964, he soon after lost his graduate readership from the University for his poor GPA. In 1967, he received his MA from Nebraska.

Career
After earning his MA, Kooser worked at Bankers Life Nebraska. He eventually went on to work for Lincoln Benefit Life (a subsidiary of Allstate), an insurance company, for 35 years before retiring as vice president at the age of 60.  He wrote for an hour and a half before work every morning, and by the time he retired, Kooser had published seven books of poetry. Kooser taught as a Presidential Professor in the English department of the University of Nebraska-Lincoln and is currently a Professor Emeritus. 

On August 12, 2004, he was named Poet Laureate Consultant in Poetry by the Librarian of Congress to serve a term from October 2004 through May 2005. 

In April 2005, Theodore J. Kooser was appointed to serve a second term as Poet Laureate Consultant in Poetry. During that same week, Kooser received the 2005 Pulitzer Prize for Poetry for his book Delights & Shadows (Copper Canyon Press, 2004). Edward Hirsch wrote: "There is a sense of quiet amazement at the core of all Kooser’s work, but it especially seems to animate his new collection of poems, Delights & Shadows."

Kooser's most recent books are Kindest Regards: New and Selected Poems and Red Stilts (2020).

He founded and hosted the newspaper project "American Life in Poetry". In 2020, Kooser chose Kwame Dawes, a chancellor of the Academy of American Poets, to be his successor as of January 1, 2021. Kooser also edits the Ted Kooser Contemporary Poetry series published by the University of Nebraska Press.

Awards & Honors

Midwest Poetry Renaissance 
Ted Kooser was part of the Midwest Poetry Renaissance in the 1960s and 1970s. The Midwest Poetry Renaissance drew on elements of Rural America through a five state swath of the Great Plains region. Poets of the midwest were respected among artists throughout the country due to being informed of larger societal forces, such as the distrust of a media-driven culture.

More small presses opened up in that time, and Midwestern poets began publishing more work. Warren Woessner regards the catalyst of the MPR to be the anthology Heartland in 1967. The movement began to develop after that point, along with the works of Ted and other poets such as Victor Contoski, Mak Vinz, David Steinglass, Gary Gildner, James Hazard, Greg Kuzma, Judith Minty, and Kathy Weigner (as well as many others) who exemplified the rural subject matter and conversational tone. Most of the poets were in their twenties or early thirties and published their first books.

Ted was in his late twenties and thirties during the decade the Midwest Poetry Renaissance occurred. He published his first book through the University of Nebraska Press at age 30, titled “Official Entry Blank.” Ted’s first full-length book was already out of print by the early 1970s, at which time he became more of a small press poet like many other poets in the Midwest. Ted continued to receive publication of individual poems within anthologies, and published several more books on small presses. He also began to edit The New Salt Creek Reader, which had six anthologies by 1974.

According to Warren Woessner, a poet during the Midwest Poetry Renaissance, the movement ended in 1975 with the publication of Heartland II.

Poetic Style 
Ted Kooser is known for his conversational style of poetry that is accessible to a nonliterary public. Critic Dana Gioia, in his book Can Poetry Matter?, describes Kooser’s style as "drawn from common speech, with subject matter common to the Midwest." Kooser's early and contemporary work involves both troubles for Midwesterners, and observations from everyday life. Recurring themes include love, family, place, and time, but he does not consider himself a regional poet.

Personal life
Kooser lives on an acreage near the village of Garland, Nebraska. Kooser has served on the Lincoln Library Board. He was founding president of The Nebraska Literary Heritage Association.

Kooser is married to Kathleen Rutledge, former editor of the Lincoln Journal Star. They have one son and two grandchildren.

Bibliography

Books

 Grass County. (1971).
 Twenty Poems. (1973).
 A Local Habitation and a Name. (1974).
 Not Coming to Be Barked At. (1976).
 Sure Signs: New and Selected Poems. (1980).
 One World at a Time. (1985).
 The Blizzard Voices (1986).
 Weather Central. (1994). 
 A Book of Things. (1995).
 Riding with Colonel Carter. (1999).
 Winter Morning Walks: One Hundred Postcards to Jim Harrison. (2001).
 Braided Creek: A Conversation in Poetry. (with Jim Harrison) (Copper Canyon Press, 2003).
 Delights and Shadows. (Copper Canyon Press, 2004)
 Local Wonders: Seasons in the Bohemian Alps (2004)
 Flying At Night : Poems 1965-1985 (2005)
 Lights on a Ground of Darkness: an evocation of place and time. (2005).
 The Poetry Home Repair Manual: Practical Advice For Beginning Poets (2005).
 Valentines (2008)
 Bag in the Wind (2010)
 Pursuing Blackhawk (Cedar Creek Press, Mason City, 2012)
 House Held Up by Trees (2012)
 Splitting an Order (Copper Canyon Press, 2014)
 The Bell in the Bridge (2016)
 Kindest Regards: New and Selected Poems (Copper Canyon Press, 2018)
Red Stilts (Cooper Canyon Press, 2020)

Poems

References

External links
Official website
Ted Kooser: Online Resources from the Library of Congress
American Life in Poetry, Kooser's syndicated newspaper feature
Author interview in Guernica Magazine (Guernicamag.com)
Ted Kooser biographical summary
Linton Weeks, Washington Post, "Poet Laureate's Prized Words", April 5, 2005, page C1 
A review of Delights & Shadows by Ted Kooser.

Television Profile of Ted Kooser - NET Television

1939 births
Living people
American male poets
American Poets Laureate
Poets from Iowa
Poets from Nebraska
People from Ames, Iowa
Writers from Lincoln, Nebraska
Pulitzer Prize for Poetry winners
University of Nebraska–Lincoln alumni
People from Seward County, Nebraska
Iowa State University alumni
Ames High School alumni